"Only Here for a Little While" is a song written by Wayland Holyfield and Richard Leigh, and recorded by American country music artist Billy Dean.  It was released in November 11, 1990 as the second single from his debut album Young Man.  The song spent 22 weeks on the Hot Country Songs charts, peaking at number three in early 1991.

Music video
The music video was directed by Bill Young and premiered in late 1990.

Chart performance

Year-end charts

References

1990 singles
Billy Dean songs
Songs written by Wayland Holyfield
Songs written by Richard Leigh (songwriter)
Song recordings produced by Tom Shapiro
Capitol Records Nashville singles
1990 songs